The British Columbia Senior Hockey League is a defunct men's senior ice hockey league that operated within the British Columbia Amateur Hockey Association for only two seasons, 1979–80 and 1980–81.

List of Champions
 1979-80: Delta Hurry Kings
 1980-81: Quesnel Kangaroos

References

Defunct ice hockey leagues in British Columbia
1979 establishments in British Columbia
1981 disestablishments in British Columbia
Sports leagues established in 1979
Sports leagues disestablished in 1981